Sociedad Deportiva Eibar B, S.A.D. was a Spanish football team based in Eibar, Gipuzkoa, in the autonomous community of the Basque Country.

Founded in 1994 and dissolved in 2012 it was the reserve team of SD Eibar, and held home games at Unbe Facilities, which held 1,000 spectators. Like the first team it played in azulgrana – claret and blue – with blue shorts.

Former players include Ander Capa, Xabi Irureta, Iban Fagoaga, Ion Ansotegi and Jagoba Arrasate.

The team's final head coach was Gaizka Garitano, who then took charge of Eibar's first team and led them to the top tier via consecutive promotions.

Season to season

2 seasons in Segunda División B
12 seasons in Tercera División

References

External links
Official website 
Futbolme team profile 

SD Eibar
Association football clubs established in 1994
Association football clubs disestablished in 2012
Defunct football clubs in the Basque Country (autonomous community)
1994 establishments in Spain
2012 disestablishments in Spain